Juncus phaeocephalus, the brown-headed rush, is native mostly along the coast of California, north to Oregon and Washington. It grows in moist seeps and shallow wet soil.

Distribution
Juncus phaeocephalus  is native to the coastlines of California. It is distributed in meadows and borders of swamps and coastal regions from Los Angeles County and Mendocino County to Oregon and Washington.

Habitat and ecology
Juncus phaeocephalus grows along the coast in sand dunes, marshes and sloughs. Some of them also grow inland in wet grassy meadows, bogs, and along lakes and streams, such as in the Peninsular Ranges and Transverse Ranges of Southern California. Its creeping rhizomes can spread across moist soil.

Description
Juncus phaeocephalus is a grasslike perennial with stout, creeping rhizomes. Its leaves are shorter than its flowering stems. Flowers have a brownish color and appear in spherical clusters at the tops of the flowering stems. Brown-head Rush may be mistaken for sedges or irises because of its stems and leaves. This plant produces many seeds. These ovoid seeds are about 0.6 mm in size.

Varieties
Juncus phaeocephalus is a variable species in which several subspecific varieties have been characterized mainly on its branching patterns of the inflorescences.
Named varieties include: 
J. phaeocephalus var. phaeocephalus — plants with few, many-flowered heads.
J. phaeocephalus var. paniculatus— plants with many, few-flowered heads. 
J. phaeocephalus var. glomeratus — plants with many, many-flowered heads.

Poisonous plant
According to the tests made on the plants at the Chemistry Laboratory of the California Department of Food and Agriculture, Juncus phaeocephalus has as much as 30 ppm of hydrocyanic acid present in the plants. Due to its volatile nature, the concentration of this chemical might have been greater before the actual testing was made.

One actual case of hydrocyanic acid poisoning from a common rush occurred in California. In December 1958, two dairy heifers were found dead on a farm land near Petaluma, Sonoma County. The heifers died due to consumption of Juncus phaeocephalus plants. Juncus phaeocephalus grows in plant communities with Verbena spp., Mimulus guttatus, Eleocharis macrostachya and Agrostis densiflora.

References

External links
 Jepson Manual treatment for Juncus phaeocephalus
Calflora database: Juncus phaeocephalus
 Juncus phaeocephalus — U.C. Photo gallery

phaeocephalus
Flora of the West Coast of the United States
Flora of California
Flora of the Sierra Nevada (United States)
Natural history of the California Coast Ranges
Plants described in 1868
Flora without expected TNC conservation status